This list of the Cenozoic life of North Dakota contains the various prehistoric life-forms whose fossilized remains have been reported from within the US state of North Dakota and are between 66 million and 10,000 years of age.

A

 Acer
 †Acrovena – type locality for genus
 †Acrovena laevis – type locality for species
 †Actinodonta
 †Adjidaumo
 †Adjidaumo minimus
 †Adjidaumo minutus
  †Aesculus
 †Aesculus hickeyi – type locality for species
 †Agnotocastor
 †Agnotocastor praetereadens
 †Aletodon
 †Aletodon quadravus
  †Allognathosuchus – type locality for genus
 †Allognathosuchus mlynarskii – type locality for species
 †Altasciurus
 †Altasciurus leonardi – type locality for species
 †Alveugena
 †Alveugena carbonensis
 †Amersinia
 †Amersinia FU082 informal
 †Amersinia FU82 informal
 †Amesoneuron
 †Amesoneuron FU037 informal
 Amia
 †Amia fragosa
 †Amia uintaensis
 †Ampelopsis
 †Ampelopsis acerifolia
 †Amphicaenopus
 †Amphicaenopus platycephalus
 †Ankylodon – or unidentified comparable form
 †Apternodus
  †Archaeocyon
 †Archaeocyon leptodus
  †Archaeotherium
 †Archaeotherium mortoni
 †Arctocyon
 †Ardynomys
 †Ardynomys saskatchewensis
 †Averrhoites
 †Averrhoites affinis
 †Axestemys
 †Axestemys montinsana
  Azolla
 †Azolla montana
 †Azolla stanleyi – type locality for species
 †Azollopsis
 †Azollopsis tomentosa

B

 †Bathycyathus
 †Bathycyathus lloydi – type locality for species
 †Batrachosauroides
 †Batrachosauroides gotoi – type locality for species
 †Beringiaphyllum – report made of unidentified related form or using admittedly obsolete nomenclature
 †Beringiaphyllum cupanioides
 †Bessoecetor
 †Bessoecetor septentrionalis
 Betula
 †Betula hesterna – type locality for species
 †Bisonalveus
 †Bisonalveus holtzmani
  †Borealosuchus
 †Borealosuchus formidabilis – type locality for species
 †Boremys
  †Bothriodon
  †Brachycrus
 †Browniea
 †Browniea serrata

C

 †Cabomba
 †Cabomba inermis
 †Calamagras
 †Calamagras weigeli
 †Canariophyllum – type locality for genus
 †Canariophyllum ampla – type locality for species
 Canticocculus
 †Cantius
 †Cantius frugivorus
 †Carpites
 †Carpites verrucosus
 †Carpodaptes
 †Carpodaptes hazelae – or unidentified comparable form
 †Carpodaptes hobackensis – or unidentified comparable form
 †Carpolithes
 †Carpolithes arcticus
 †Carpolithes bryangosus – type locality for species
 †Carpolithes lunatus – type locality for species
  Carya
 †Carya antiquorum
 †Cedromus
 †Cedromus wardi
  Celtis
 †Celtis aspera
 †Centetodon
 †Centetodon chadronensis
 †Centetodon magnus
 †Centetodon marginalis
 †Centimanomys
 †Ceratophyllum
 †Ceratophyllum FU080 informal
  Cercidiphyllum
 †Cercidiphyllum arcticum
 †Cercidiphyllum articum
 †Cercidiphyllum ellipticum
 †Cercidiphyllum genetrix
 †Chaetoptelea
 †Chaetoptelea microphylla
  †Champsosaurus
 †Champsosaurus gigas – type locality for species
 †Champsosaurus tenuis – type locality for species
 †Chrysotriton – type locality for genus
 †Chrysotriton tiheni – type locality for species
 Cocculus
 †Cocculus flabella
  †Coniophis
 †Conoryctella
 †Conoryctella dragonensis – or unidentified comparable form
 †Cornophyllum
 †Cornophyllum newberryi
 Cornus
 †Cornus hyperborea
 †Corylus
 †Corylus acutertiaria – type locality for species
 †Corylus FU079 informal
 †Corylus insignis
  †Coryphodon
 †Coryphodon armatus – or unidentified comparable form
 †Cotradechites – type locality for genus
 †Cotradechites lithinus – type locality for species
  †Credneria
 †Credneria daturaefolia – tentative report
 †Cupressinocladus
 †Cupressinocladus interruptus
 Cyclocarya
 †Cyclocarya brownii
 †Cylindrodon
 †Cylindrodon collinus
 †Cyperacites
 †Cypressaurus

D

 †Dakotornis – type locality for genus
 †Dakotornis cooperi – type locality for species
  †Daphoenus
 †Davidia
 †Davidia antiqua
 †Dennstaedtia
 †Dennstaedtia americana
 †Diacocherus
 †Diacocherus minutus
  †Diacodexis – tentative report
  †Diceratherium
 †Diceratherium tridactylum
 Dicotylophyllum
 †Dicotylophyllum anomalum
 †Dicotylophyllum hamameloides – type locality for species
 †Dicotylophyllum hebronensis – type locality for species
 †Dicotylophyllum mercerensis – type locality for species
 †Dicotylophyllum oblongatum – type locality for species
 †Didelphodus – or unidentified comparable form
 †Didymictis
  †Dinictis
 †Dissacus
 †Dombeya
 †Dombeya novimundi – type locality for species
 †Domnina
 †Domnina sagittariensis – type locality for species
 †Domnina thompsoni – or unidentified comparable form
 †Dorraletes
 †Dorraletes diminutivus
 †Douglassciurus
 †Douglassciurus jeffersoni
 †Drepanochilus – tentative report

E

  †Echmatemys
 †Echmatemys testudinea
  †Ectocion
 †Ectocion collinus
 †Ectypodus
 †Ectypodus hazeni
 †Ectypodus lovei
 †Elliptio
 †Elliptio priscus
  †Elomeryx
 †Elomeryx armatus
 †Entomolestes
 †Equisetum
 †Equisetum FU036 informal
 †Equisetum magnum – type locality for species
 †Eucommia
 †Eucommia serrata
 †Eumys
 †Eumys brachyodus
 †Eumys elegans
 †Eumys lammersi – type locality for species
 †Eutypomys
 †Eutypomys hibernodus – type locality for species
 †Eutypomys parvus

F

  Ficus
 †Ficus subtruncata
 †Fokieniopsis
 †Fokieniopsis catenulata
 †Fraxinus
 †Fraxinus eocenica

G

 Ginkgo
  †Ginkgo adiantoides
 Glyptostrobus
 †Glyptostrobus europaeus
 †Glyptostrobus nordenskioldi
 †Gomphaeschna
 †Gomphaeschna schrankii – type locality for species

H

 †Harmsia
 †Harmsia hydrocotyloidea
 †Heliscomys
 †Heliscomys borealis – type locality for species
 †Heliscomys medius – or unidentified comparable form
 †Heliscomys senex
 †Heliscomys vetus – or unidentified comparable form
  †Helodermoides
 Hemitelia
 †Hemitelia magna
 †Herpetotherium
 †Herpetotherium fugax – or unidentified comparable form
 †Herpetotherium valens
  †Hesperocyon
 †Hesperocyon gregarius
 †Hesperopetes
 †Hesperopetes blacki – or unidentified comparable form
 †Homogalax
 †Homogalax aureus – type locality for species
 †Hydromystria
 †Hydromystria expansa
 †Hyopsodus
 †Hyopsodus loomisi
 †Hypertragulus
  †Hyracodon

I

 †Ignacius
 †Ignacius frugivorus
  †Ischyromys
 †Ischyromys junctus
 †Ischyromys typus
 †Ischyromys veterior – or unidentified comparable form
 †Isoetites
 †Isoetites horridus

J

 †Joffrichthys
 †Joffrichthys triangulpterus – type locality for species
 Juglans
 †Juglans taurina

K

  †Kalmia – report made of unidentified related form or using admittedly obsolete nomenclature
 †Kalmia elliptica
 †Kirkomys

L

 †Labidolemur
 †Labidolemur soricoides
 †Lemnaceae
 †Lemnaceae scutatum
  Lepisosteus
 †Lepisosteus occidentalis
 †Leptacodon
 †Leptacodon tener
  †Leptauchenia
 †Leptauchenia decora
 †Leptictis
 †Leptictis acutidens – or unidentified comparable form
 †Leptictis dakotensis
 †Leptodontomys
 †Leptodontomys douglassi
  †Leptomeryx
 †Leptomeryx evansi
 †Leptomeryx yoderi – or unidentified comparable form
 †Litocherus
 †Litocherus zygeus
 †Lophiparamys
 †Lophiparamys murinus – or unidentified comparable form
 Lygodium
 †Lygodium kaulfussi

M

 Marchantia
 †Marchantia pealei
 †Marchantia pealii
 †Megalagus
 †Megalagus brachyodon – or unidentified comparable form
  †Megalonyx
 †Megalonyx jeffersonii
 †Meliosma
 †Meliosma longifolia
 †Meliosoma
 †Meliosoma rostellata
 †Menispermites
 †Menispermites parvareolatus – type locality for species
 †Merychyus
 †Merycochoerus
  †Merycoidodon
 †Merycoidodon bullatus
 †Merycoidodon culbertsoni
 †Merycoidodon major
 †Mesodma
 †Mesodma pygmaea
  †Mesohippus
 †Mesohippus bairdi
 †Mesohippus propinquus – or unidentified comparable form
 †Mesohippus westoni – or unidentified comparable form
  †Metamynodon
 †Metaparamys
 †Metaparamys dawsonae – or unidentified comparable form
 Metasequoia
 †Metasequoia occidentalis
  †Miacis
 †Microcosmodon
 †Microparamys – or unidentified comparable form
 †Micropternodus
 †Micropternodus borealis – or unidentified comparable form
 †Microsyops
 †Microsyops angustidens
 †Mimetodon
 †Mimetodon silberlingi
 †Miniochoerus
 †Miniochoerus starkensis – type locality for species
 †Miohippus
 †Miohippus obliquidens
 †Musophyllum
 †Musophyllum complicatum

N

 †Nannodectes
 †Nanotragulus
 †Nelumbago
 †Nelumbago montanum
 †Nelumbium
  †Nelumbo
 †Nelumbo aureavallis – type locality for species
 †Nelumbo FU062 informal
 †Nelumbo FU085 informal
 †Nelumbo FU62 informal
 †Neoplagiaulax
 †Neoplagiaulax hunteri
 †Neoplagiaulax mckennai
 †Neoplagiaulax nanophus
 †Nephrops
 †Nephrops buntingi – type locality for species
 †Nordenskioldia
 †Nordenskioldia borealis
 †Notomorpha
 †Notomorpha garmanii
  †Nototeredo
 †Nototeredo globosa
 †Nyssa
 †Nyssa alata
 †Nyssidium
 †Nyssidium arcticum
 †Nyssidium articum

O

 †Ogmophis
 †Ogmophis compactus
 †Oligoryctes
 †Oligoryctes altitalonidus
 †Oligoryctes cameronensis – or unidentified comparable form
 †Oligoscalops
 †Oligoscalops galbreathi
 †Oligotheriomys
 †Oligotheriomys magnus
 †Oligotheriomys primus – type locality for species
  †Onoclea
 †Onoclea hesperia
  †Ophiomorpha
 †Ophiomorpha nodosa
 †Oreithyia
 †Oreithyia oaklandi
 †Osbornodon
 †Osbornodon renjiei – type locality for species
 †Osmunda
 †Osmunda macrophylla
 †Oxyacodon
 †Oxyacodon priscilla

P

 †Palaeanodon – tentative report
 †Palaeocarpinus
  †Palaeolagus
 †Palaeolagus haydeni
 †Palaeolagus temnodon – or unidentified comparable form
 †Palaeophytocrene
 †Palaeopsammia
 †Palaeopsammia zitteli – type locality for species
 †Palaeoryctes
 †Palaeoryctes punctatus – or unidentified comparable form
  †Palaeosinopa
 †Palaeoxantusia – report made of unidentified related form or using admittedly obsolete nomenclature
 †Palaeoxantusia borealis
 †Paleotomus
 †Paleotomus senior – or unidentified comparable form
 †Palmacites
 †Paradjidaumo
 †Paradjidaumo hansonorum – or unidentified comparable form
 †Paradjidaumo trilophus
 †Paramys
 †Paramys excavatus – or unidentified comparable form
 †Paranymphaea
 †Paranymphaea crassifolia
 †Pararyctes
 †Pararyctes pattersoni
 †Parataxodium – or unidentified comparable form
 †Paraternstroemia – type locality for genus
 †Paraternstroemia hyphovenosa – type locality for species
 †Parectypodus
 †Parectypodus lunatus
  †Peltosaurus – or unidentified comparable form
 †Penosphyllum
 †Penosphyllum cordatum
 †Peradectes
 †Peradectes elegans
 †Persites – type locality for genus
 †Persites argutus – type locality for species
  †Phenacodus
 †Phenacodus grangeri
 †Phenacodus magnus
 †Phyllites
 †Phyllites demoresi
 †Phyllites disturbans
 †Piceoerpeton
 †Piceoerpeton willwoodense
  Pinus
 †Pinus peregrinus – type locality for species
 †Pipestoneomys
 †Planatus
 †Planatus raynoldsi
 †Plastomenus
 Platanus
 †Platanus nobilis
 †Platanus raynoldsi
 †Platanus raynoldsii
  Platycarya
 †Platycarya americana
  †Plesiadapis
 †Plesiadapis anceps
 †Plesiadapis churchilli – or unidentified comparable form
 †Plesiadapis fodinatus – or unidentified comparable form
 †Plesiadapis rex
  †Poebrotherium
 †Poebrotherium wilsoni
 Populus
 †Populus nebrascensis
 †Prochetodon
 †Prochetodon foxi
 †Prodiacodon
 †Prodiacodon tauricinerei – or unidentified comparable form
 †Prolapsus
 †Propalaeosinopa
 †Propalaeosinopa albertensis
 †Prosciurus
 †Prosciurus albiclivus – type locality for species
 †Prosciurus hogansoni – type locality for species
 †Prosciurus vetustus
 †Protictis
 †Protictis microlestes – or unidentified comparable form
 †Protictis paralus – type locality for species
  †Protoceras – tentative report
 †Protochelydra
 †Protochelydra zangerli
 †Protophyllum
 †Protophyllum semotum – type locality for species
 †Protungulatum
 †Pseudocylindrodon
 †Pseudocylindrodon silvaticus
 †Psidium – tentative report
 Pterocarya
 †Pterocarya hispida
 †Pterospermites
 †Pterospermites cordata
  †Ptilodus
 †Ptilodus kummae
 †Ptilodus montanus
 †Ptilodus wyomingensis

Q

 †Queironius – type locality for genus
 †Queironius praelapsus – type locality for species
  Quercus
 †Quercus macneili
 †Quercus sullyi
 †Quercus yulensis
 †Quereuxia
 †Quereuxia angulata

R

 †Reithroparamys
  Rhineura – or unidentified comparable form

S

 Sagittaria
 †Sagittaria megasperma
 †Salvinia
 †Salvinia aureovallis – type locality for species
 †Salvinia preauriculata
  †Saniwa
 †Saniwa edura – type locality for species
 †Saniwa ensidens – or unidentified comparable form
 †Sauropithecoides – type locality for genus
 †Sauropithecoides charisticus – type locality for species
 †Scapherpeton
 †Selaginella
 †Selaginella collieri
  †Simoedosaurus
 †Simoedosaurus dakotensis – type locality for species
 †Sinclairella
 †Sparganium
 †Sparganium antiquum
 †Sparganium parvum – type locality for species
 †Sparganium stygium
 †Spathorhynchus – or unidentified comparable form
 †Stibarus
 †Stibarus montanus
 †Stillingia
 †Stillingia casca – type locality for species
  †Subhyracodon
 †Subhyracodon occidentalis

T

 Taxodium
 †Taxodium olrikii
  †Teilhardina
 †Ternstroemites
 †Ternstroemites aureavallis – type locality for species
 †Tetonoides
 †Tetonoides pearcei
 Thamnophis
 †Thryptacodon
 †Thryptacodon australis
 †Thuites
 †Thuites interruptus
 †Thuja
 †Thuja interrupta
 Tinosaurus
  †Titanoides
 †Titanoides primaevus – type locality for species
 †Toxotherium
  †Trapa
 †Trapa angulata
 †Trichopterodomus – type locality for genus
 †Trichopterodomus leonardi – type locality for species
  †Trigonias
 Trochocyathus
 †Trochocyathus mitratus – type locality for species
 †Trochodendroides
 †Trochodendroides serrulata
 †Tuberculacerta – type locality for genus
 †Tuberculacerta pearsoni – type locality for species

U

 †Unuchinia
 †Unuchinia dysmathes

V

  †Viburnum
 †Viburnum antiquum
 †Viburnum tilioides

W

  †Wannaganosuchus – type locality for genus
 †Wannaganosuchus brachymanus – type locality for species
 †Wardiaphyllum
 †Wardiaphyllum daturaefolium
 †Willeumys
 †Willeumys viduus
  †Woodwardia
 †Woodwardia arctica
 †Woodwardia gravida – type locality for species

X

 †Xestops – or unidentified comparable form

Y

 †Yoderimys
 †Yoderimys stewarti – or unidentified comparable form

Z

 †Zingiberopsis – type locality for genus
 †Zingiberopsis isonervosa – type locality for species

References

 

Cenozoic
North Dakota